Abigail Pierrepont Johnson (born December 19, 1961) is an American billionaire businesswoman, and the granddaughter of the late Edward C. Johnson II; the founder of Fidelity Investments. Since 2014, Johnson has been president and chief executive officer (CEO) of American investment firm Fidelity Investments (FMR), and chair of its international former sister company Fidelity International (FIL). Fidelity was founded by her grandfather Edward C. Johnson II. Her father, Edward C. "Ned" Johnson III, remained chair emeritus of FMR until his death in March 2022. As of March 2013, the Johnson family owned a 49% stake in the privately-held company, with Johnson herself holding an estimated 24.5%.  She is a board member of Breakthrough Energy Ventures.

In November 2016, Johnson was named chair and remained CEO and president, giving her full control of Fidelity with 45,000 employees worldwide. Johnson's wealth is approximately $22.6 billion, making her one of the world's wealthiest women. She was named on Forbes' "The Richest Person In America's 50 Largest Cities" list in 2016 and ranked sixth in 2021 on their "Powerful Women" list. She was the richest person in Massachusetts in 2020.

Early life and education 
Johnson attended Cambridge, Massachusetts private school Buckingham Browne & Nichols School and then graduated from Hobart and William Smith college with a bachelor's degree in art history in 1984. After working as a consultant at Booz Allen Hamilton, where she met her husband, Johnson completed an MBA at Harvard Business School.

Fidelity Investments 
Upon graduating from Harvard Business School in 1988, Johnson joined Fidelity Investments, which her grandfather Edward Johnson II founded in 1946 and of which her father Edward Johnson III was then the CEO. She began as an analyst and portfolio manager. In 2001, she was promoted to president of Fidelity Asset Management. During her time in that position, Johnson unsuccessfully attempted to orchestrate a vote to remove her father as CEO over disagreements about his business decisions. In 2005, she became Head of Retail, Workplace, and Institutional Business. She was named president in 2012. In 2014, she became CEO, and in 2016 she became chairman as well. In 2018, Johnson introduced cryptocurrency investment at Fidelity, making it possible for institutional investors to trade bitcoin and ethereum.

Politics
In 2015, Johnson donated $2,700, the maximum amount legally allowed for presidential primary campaigns, to Republican candidate Jeb Bush. In 2016, she donated about $330,000 to Hillary Clinton's campaign and the Democratic National Committee.

Awards and honors  
Johnson has served as a member of the Committee on Capital Markets Regulation and as a member of the board of directors of the Securities Industry and Financial Markets Association (SIFMA) and of  MIT. She is the first and only woman to serve on the board of the Financial Services Forum.

Forbes has ranked Johnson among the most powerful women in the world for several years:

See also 
 Lists of billionaires

References 

1961 births
Living people
American billionaires
American chief executives of financial services companies
Female billionaires
Harvard Business School alumni
Hobart and William Smith Colleges alumni
Businesspeople from Boston
American chairpersons of corporations
American women chief executives
Booz Allen Hamilton people
20th-century American businesspeople
20th-century American businesswomen
Women in finance
21st-century American businesspeople
Buckingham Browne & Nichols School alumni
Fidelity International
21st-century American businesswomen